Lebanon Road tram stop is a light rail stop in the London Borough of Croydon in the southern suburbs of London. It serves the residential area along Addiscombe Road to the east of the centre of the town of Croydon. The stop is named after Lebanon Road, a cross-street in the vicinity of the stop.

The tram stop is within the section of route where the tram line runs within Addiscombe Road, sharing road space with buses and local traffic. The two platforms are located on each side of the two lane road, but are staggered laterally rather than being opposite each other.

Services
Lebanon Road is served by tram services operated by Tramlink. 

It is served by the following tram services:
 A tram every 7-8 minutes (reducing to every 15 mins on weekend evenings) between New Addington and 

Services are operated using Bombardier CR4000 and Stadler Variobahn Trams.

Connections
The stop is served by London Buses routes 119, 194, 198 and 466 which provide connections to Bromley, Beckenham, Hayes, Croydon Town Centre, Thornton Heath, Purley and Caterham.

Free interchange for journeys made within an hour is available between bus services and between buses and trams is available at Lebanon Road as part of Transport for London's Hopper Fare.

References

External links

Lebanon Road Tram Stop – Timetables and live departures at Transport for London

Tramlink stops in the London Borough of Croydon
Railway stations in Great Britain opened in 2000